Long Lost Father is a 1934 American pre-Code drama film starring John Barrymore, Helen Chandler, Donald Cook, Alan Mowbray, and Doris Lloyd. It was directed by Ernest B. Schoedsack. It was based on a 1933 novel of the same title by the British writer Gladys Stern.

Plot summary
A wastrel father and his long-abandoned daughter find themselves working in the same London nightclub. Gradually they come to bond and repair their broken relationship.

Cast

References

External links
 
 
 
 

1934 films
Films directed by Ernest B. Schoedsack
1934 drama films
American black-and-white films
American drama films
RKO Pictures films
Films set in London
Films based on British novels
1930s English-language films
1930s American films